Camille Angelina Purcell, known professionally as Kamille (Stylised KAMILLE), is an English singer, songwriter, producer and record label owner.

Personal life and career beginnings 
Camille took part in many school productions and plays and studied part-time at the Sylvia Young Theatre School to strengthen her singing, dancing, and acting skills. However, she was encouraged to focus on her education, which her parents always placed paramount over extra-curricular activities. Camille then decided to finish her school, sixth form and university qualifications, where she gained a Masters in Economics.

Kamille began her career by spending her extra curricular time in studios she was introduced to by a friend.

She appeared on The X Factor as a vocal coach/mentor and on the couch panel of ITV2's The Xtra Factor.

In June 2020, she became engaged to producer Tazer and the two married in August 2021.

Songwriting, production and Pure Cut
Kamille's break as a songwriter came in March 2013 when her first co-write, "What About Us" by The Saturdays featuring Sean Paul, was a UK number-one single.

Later in 2013, Kamille co-wrote 3 songs for girl-group Little Mix for their sophomore album ‘Salute’. This began a long-term relationship which propelled them, and Kamille herself, to worldwide success. ‘Black Magic’, co-written for Little Mix and released in 2015, became not only Kamille's second UK number-one single, but also gained her her first Brit Award nomination for Best British Single. Another notable hit written for the group is ‘Shout Out To My Ex’ in 2016. The track spent 3 weeks at #1 in the UK and has since been certified 3× Platinum in the UK, becoming the first single by a girl group in a decade to achieve this milestone. The track won Kamille her first Brit Award in 2017, for ‘Best British Single’. For Little Mix Kamille has co-written over 30 songs overall, which have contributed to six consecutive UK Top 5 albums and nine UK Top 20 singles. She has been considered the group's unofficial 5th member, both publicly by Little Mix themselves, and by the national press, with one member Jade Thirlwall commenting, ‘we wouldn't be where we are now in our career without this angel’ on her personal Instagram in 2019.

Kamille has collaborated with other globally successful artists, achieving multiple successes. In 2018 she achieved two UK #1 singles back-to-back, first with ‘I'll Be There’ co-written for Jess Glynne, immediately followed by ‘Solo’ co-written for Clean Bandit featuring Demi Lovato. ‘Solo’ was named the ‘most-Shazamed’ song of 2018. Kamille's achievements were recognised at the A&R Awards 2018 where she won Songwriter of the Year.

In January 2019 Kamille co-wrote ‘Don't Call Me Up’ for Mabel with Steve Mac. 'Don't Call Me Up' has become Mabel's most successful song to date, peaking at #3 in the UK singles chart, being nominated for a Brit Award for ‘Best British Single’, achieving 2× Platinum status in the UK and amassing over 700 million Spotify streams. The song finished 2019 as the 9th best-selling single for a female artist in the UK, and fourth best-selling by a female artist. Kamille has additionally co-written ‘Mad Love’ and ‘Boyfriend’ for Mabel which have achieved Platinum and Gold UK certifications respectively, and she appeared as a featured artist on Mabel's debut album ‘High Expectations’, singing a verse on the track ‘Selfish Love’. Kamille has co-written all of Mabel's singles that have charted in the Top 10 in the UK since 2019.

2019 saw Kamille further recognised for her contributions to the music industry when she was awarded the Music Creative Award at the Music Week Women in Music Awards for “significant contribution to the making of music behind the scenes, through songwriting, studio production, or studio technology”.

In November 2019 Kamille officially launched her record label and publishing company, Pure Cut. She has cited fellow artist and businesswoman Beyoncé as an inspiration behind creation of the label, stating: "Seeing the empire Beyoncé's building now, it just cemented how I felt all along: that I want to be able to do that, and I want more for myself. I think that's driven me. What I want to do is be a helpful hand for artists with whatever they need, I can't have this knowledge and experience and not give that to others and share that with people. That's really where I'm coming from." With herself as an artist as her first signing, she has released multiple tracks, and plans to launch her first Pure Cut artist signings in late 2021. Alongside the launch of Pure Cut, Kamille built and launched her own recording studio called 'Saint Studios' situated within London's Metropolis Studios, where she will write and produce tracks for artists as a songwriter, as well as records for Pure Cut artist signings.

In 2020, Kamille was nominated for the Mercury Prize for her work on Dua Lipa's album ‘Future Nostalgia’, and she contributed to five UK Top 10 Singles: Little Mix's ‘Break Up Song’, Mabel's ‘Boyfriend’, AJ Tracey & Mabel's ‘West Ten’, Clean Bandit, and Mabel & 24kGoldn's ‘Tick Tock’. As well as co-writing, she also provided an uncredited vocal hook to Headie One, AJ Tracey and Stormzy's single ‘Ain't It Different’, singing the lyrics to sampled track 'No Long Talking' by Baby Saw. ‘Ain't It Different’ also appeared on Headie One's album ‘Edna’ which debuted at #1 in the UK Albums Chart.

2020 lead Kamille to take active steps in the music industry to promote opportunities for women in music. She took up a year-long mentorship of songwriter and producer Griff as part of the Ivor's Academy Rising Star Award programme, and she teamed up with producer and songwriter Fred Again to launch the 'Next Up' programme with She Is the Music to seek and mentor a female producer.

In March 2021, Kamille won her first Grammy Award as 'Future Nostalgia' won 'Pop Vocal Album' at the 63rd Grammy Awards. She was nominated for a Brit Award for the sixth time as 'Ain't It Different' was nominated for 'British Single'. She then achieved her 18th UK Top 10 single in June 2021 when Little Mix's re-release of single 'Confetti', with an added verse from American rapper Saweetie, hit a new peak of #9.

Overall, Kamille's co-writing and co-production contributions have accumulated to over 6.8 billion streams on Spotify alone, as well as 24 UK Platinum certifications, 5 UK #1 singles, 18 UK Top 10 singles, #1 singles in over 15 countries and hundreds of hours of airplay on radio across the globe.

Artist career 
In 2017, Kamille officially launched her career as an artist in her own right. She first released the single "Body" featuring Avelino, followed by "Raindrops". These singles featured on her debut EP, My Head's a Mess on 17 November 2017 through Virgin EMI.

In March & April 2018 Kamille featured as a live solo artist for the first time when she opened for Jessie Ware on her UK Tour. In June 2018 Kamille featured as the vocalist on Gorgon City & Ghosted's 'Go Deep', and in July she released her new solo single 'Emotional' featuring Kranium and Louis Rei. The song was later remixed to include verses from Chip and Stefflon Don.

Kamille has featured as the live vocalist for British DJ Jax Jones, performing with him in the BBC Radio 1 Live Lounge, at the 2018 Jingle Bell Ball at the O2 Arena in London, and on the Christmas Edition of Top of the Pops in December 2018.

In 2019 Kamille focused her artist efforts on collaboration. She appeared as a featured artist on 'My Love' with Dr Vades & 'Easy Loving You' on SG Lewis' EP 'Blue', and she collaborated with GRM Daily on the track 'One More Night' featuring herself, Wretch 32 & WSTRN. Kamille finished 2019 as an artist by appearing alongside Little Mix for the first time as an artist when she featured on single 'More Than Words' taken from the group's fifth album, LM5. She performed the track live with the group for its live debut at the O2 Arena, London in November 2019.

At the tail end of 2019, Kamille officially launched her record label and publishing company, Pure Cut. With herself as the first signing, her first Pure Cut release was single 'Don't Answer' featuring Wiley. She then released her first Christmas single on the label, 'Santa x4' featuring Next Town Down.

In 2020, Kamille released two new solo singles, 'Love + Attention' and 'Somebody' featuring Ebenezer, as well as featuring as an artist on 'Miss Jagger' with Lotto Boyzz.

In January 2021, Kamille released the single 'AYO!' with S1mba, which is set to be the first single for an as yet untitled debut solo album. The music video for 'AYO!' featured her new studio, Saint Studios, in public eye for the first time. The second single, 'Mirror Mirror' released in March 2021, has a music video with cameos from MNEK and Little Mix's Jade Thirlwall. The track went viral on TikTok, reaching #1 on the UK Hot 50 Chart and the associated hashtag #WhoTheBaddest being used over 68 million times.

Kamille provided the vocals for 'Move' by Kingdom 93 & Goldfingers in May 2021, released on Warner Records.

Discography

Extended plays

Singles

Guest appearances

Songwriting and production credits
 indicates a background vocal contribution.

 indicates an un-credited lead vocal contribution.

 indicates a credited vocal/featured artist contribution.

^ indicates a production credit in addition to a songwriting credit

Awards

References

Year of birth missing (living people)
Living people
21st-century Black British women singers
English songwriters
English record producers
English people of Cuban descent
British women record producers
English people of Jamaican descent
Singers from London